Sala Thammasop is a khwaeng (sub-district) of Bangkok's Thawi Watthana district. It has an area of 28.698 km2 (about 11 mi2).

History
The name Sala Thammasop refers to a 'pavilion for sermons', but in the past it was called Sala Tham Sop meaning 'funeral pavilion'. King Mongkut (Rama IV) ordered the digging of the (Khlong Maha Sawat) with salas (pavilions) along the banks of the canal. There were twin salas for disposing of the bodies of those who died digging the canal. It was called Sala Tham Sop. The name was later changed to the more pleasant-sounding Sala Thammasop. Another of the salas was Salaya, a sala that housed medical textbooks. It became the name of Salaya Subdistrict of Phutthamonthon District.

Places
Sala Thammasop railway station
Phuttamonthon Sai 2 Railway Halt
Thongsuk College
Utthayan Avenue
Borommaratchachonnani Road

References

Thawi Watthana district
Subdistricts of Bangkok